Heráclides César de Souza Araújo (24 June 1886 – 10 August 1962) was a Brazilian scientist known for his research into the control and treatment of leprosy. He served on the World Health Organization (WHO) Expert Panel on Leprosy and on the council of the International Leprosy Association, and received national honours in recognition of his work.

Souza Araújo was born in Imbituva, Paraná, Brazil, in 1886. He graduated from the Escola de Farmácia de Ouro Preto in Minas Gerais and enrolled immediately at the Faculdade de Medicina de Rio de Janeiro, finishing there in 1915. While still a student, he also completed the Curso de Applicação offered by the Instituto Oswaldo Cruz (IOC) in 1913. He received his doctorate from IOC, with his thesis entitled Estudo sobre o granuloma venéreo. His training concluded with the courses in Public Health at Johns Hopkins University in the US in 1926, and in Dermatology at the London School of Dermatology between 1930 and 1931.

After graduation Souza Araújo remained affiliated with the Instituto Oswaldo Cruz and began to concentrate on the area of leprology. During the 1920s he served as head of the Rural Sanitary Service of Pará, opening the Lazarópolis do Prata leprosarium on June 24, 1924. He later wrote a monograph on this leprosarium.

As a researcher at IOC he published around 210 scientific works and headed the Leprology Laboratory from 1927 to 1956. He also edited the journal Memórias do Instituto Oswaldo Cruz during the same period. He was head of the Bacteriology Section and of the Division of Microbiology and Immunology from 1946 to 1956, and professor of the application course from 1928 to 1956.

As an internationally renowned researcher Souza Araújo had an important role in the creation of the International Society of Leprology, holding the post of vice-president from 1932 to 1956.

He dedicated himself to research into the control and treatment of leprosy, and played an important role both as a formulator of policy and as a critic of the policies and public initiatives in the field. He visited the main institutions involved in the study of and fight against the disease, both in Brazil and abroad. He was nominated Knight-Commander of the Military and Hospital Order of St. Lazarus of Jerusalem in 1936 and was a member of the WHO Expert Panel on Leprosy.

Despite retiring in 1956, Souza Araújo continued working at the IOC until his death in 1962. In 1960 the Brazilian government awarded him the Order of Medical Merit in recognition of his outstanding work. He was a Councillor of the International Leprosy Association and patron of the Center for the Study of Leprosy of the University of Parana, to which he donated his personal collection of books on leprosy.

Publications
A História da Lepra no Brasil: Volume I, 1946. Imprensa Nacional, Rio de Janeiro.
A História da Lepra no Brasil: Volume II, 1948. Imprensa Nacional, Rio de Janeiro.
A História da Lepra no Brasil: Volume III. Imprensa Nacional, Rio de Janeiro.
A Lepra em 40 Países, 1929. Instituto Oswaldo Cruz, Rio de Janeiro.
Lazaropolis do Prata. A primeira colonia agricola de leprosos fundada no Brasil. Monograph. Belem, 1924.
'Contribuição á epidemiologia e prophylaxia da lepra no norte do Brasil'. Mem. Inst. Osw. Cruz, 1933:27 (3)
'A lepra e as organizações anti-leprosas do Brasil em 1936: 2.- Estado do Pará - Organizações anti-leprosas: Lazaropolis do Prata'. Mem. Inst. Osw. Cruz, 1937:32 (1)
'The Leprosy Problem in Brazil'. The American Journal of Tropical Medicine, 1925:5 (3)

References

 International Journal of Leprosy, Centennial Festskrift edition, Vol 41, No 2. 1973.

1886 births
1962 deaths
Brazilian male writers
Brazilian medical researchers
People from Paraná (state)
Brazilian physicians
Members of the Brazilian Academy of Medicine
Federal University of Rio de Janeiro alumni
Johns Hopkins University alumni